The Tunisian Communist Party was a Marxist political party in Tunisia.  The PCT was founded on 21 May 1934 as the Tunisian federation of the French Communist Party, and was later converted into an independent organization. The party was banned by the Vichy regime in 1939, but after the Anglo-American liberation of Tunisia in 1943 it was able to operate legally again.  It was banned again in 1962 and legalized in 1981. On 23 April 1993, the PCT abandoned communism and changed its name to the Ettajdid Movement.

Electoral history

Chamber of Deputies elections

References

1934 establishments in Tunisia
1993 disestablishments in Tunisia
Communist parties in Tunisia
Defunct communist parties
Defunct political parties in Tunisia
Formerly banned communist parties
Formerly banned political parties in Tunisia
Political parties disestablished in 1993
Political parties established in 1934